= Agiabampo Estuary =

Estuary lagoon in Sonora and Sinaloa, Mexico

- Agiabampo (Spanish)
- Location within Sinaloa Location within Sonora
- Interactive map of Agiabampo Estuary
- Coordinates: 26°21′21.04″N 109°12′48.67″W

Agiabampo is an estuary lagoon system located in the federal states of Sonora and Sinaloa in Mexico. It is found in a coastal marginal depression in the coastal area of Gulf of California, which is connected by a swampy area. In the vicinity of the lagoon there is a hamlet also called Agiabampo.

== Location and characteristics ==
Agiabampo is located between the northwest edge of the delta of the Fuerte River and the southwest edge of the delta of the Mayo River. The Agiabampo lagoon has an average depth of about 5 m in the estuary Bacorehuis, about 2 m in the Gitzámuri estuary; The maximum depth at the mouth of the lagoon is about 13 m.

== Fauna and flora ==
The river / estuary Bacorehuis feeds the lagoon, on whose coast there is a dense population of mangroves. The lagoon is inhabited by sawfish, sea bass and groupers.
